Parnassus is a locality in the Canterbury region's Hurunui District on the east coast of New Zealand's South Island. It is located on the north bank of the Waiau River.

It takes its name from a local sheep run owned by a classical scholar, Edward Lee. He saw a likeness between a local hill and the Greek Mount Parnassus, mythical home of the god Apollo and the Muses.

State Highway 1 passes through the town on its route from Cheviot to Kaikoura, and the Main North Line railway from Christchurch to Picton also runs through the town. At one stage, the Waiau Branch was intended to be the main line north and a branch line diverged from the Waiau route in Waipara to service coastal communities. This line was opened to Parnassus in 1912 and was known as the Parnassus Branch at that stage. However, the decision was made to use the Parnassus route as the main line, relegating the route from Waipara through the Weka Pass to Waiau to the status of branch line. The Main North Line was completed in 1945 and continues to serve Parnassus today.

The epicentre of the 1901 Cheviot earthquake was at Parnassus.

Demographics

Parnassus had a population of 1,323 at the 2018 New Zealand census, an increase of 15 people (1.1%) since the 2013 census, and an increase of 51 people (4.0%) since the 2006 census. There were 546 households. There were 657 males and 666 females, giving a sex ratio of 0.99 males per female. The median age was 47 years (compared with 37.4 years nationally), with 273 people (20.6%) aged under 15 years, 153 (11.6%) aged 15 to 29, 612 (46.3%) aged 30 to 64, and 285 (21.5%) aged 65 or older.

Ethnicities were 93.9% European/Pākehā, 11.8% Māori, 1.6% Pacific peoples, 1.1% Asian, and 1.8% other ethnicities (totals add to more than 100% since people could identify with multiple ethnicities).

The proportion of people born overseas was 10.2%, compared with 27.1% nationally.

Although some people objected to giving their religion, 53.7% had no religion, 34.9% were Christian, 0.2% were Hindu, 0.2% were Muslim, 0.2% were Buddhist and 1.6% had other religions.

Of those at least 15 years old, 156 (14.9%) people had a bachelor or higher degree, and 219 (20.9%) people had no formal qualifications. The median income was $27,600, compared with $31,800 nationally. The employment status of those at least 15 was that 504 (48.0%) people were employed full-time, 222 (21.1%) were part-time, and 18 (1.7%) were unemployed.

References

External links

Populated places in Canterbury, New Zealand
Hurunui District